Thioalbus is a mesophilic, facultatively anaerobic and autotrophic genus of bacteria from the family of Ectothiorhodospiraceae with one known species (Thioalbus denitrificans). Thioalbus denitrificans has been isolated from sediments from the Sea of Japan in Korea.

References

Chromatiales
Bacteria genera
Monotypic bacteria genera
Taxa described in 2011